Wilbur Hot Springs is a naturally occurring historic hot spring, health sanctuary, personal retreat and  nature reserve in Williams, Colusa County, in northern California, United States, about 2 hours northeast of the San Francisco Bay Area and 1½ hours north of the Sacramento Airport.

Characteristics
Wilbur Hot Springs come from the ground near Bear Creek. It is part of the Western US, Baja, and British Columbia Hot Springs networks, with its elevation within Colusa County at  

Location:  near Clear Lake
Temperature:  152 °F (67 °C)
Flow:         30 gpm  (114 L/min)
Capacity:  0.6×106 Btu/hr / 0.2 MWt
Annual Energy:  4.7×109 Btu/yr  / 1.4 GWh/yr
Load Factor: 0.89
Delta T:

History
Wilbur Hot Springs’ history goes back centuries. Before European settlers came, the springs were used by the Patwin, Pomo, Wintun and Colusi – Native American inhabitants of Northern California's Coast Range mountains.  According to local lore, wealthy social activist and congressman General John Bidwell  was searching for gold in 1863 when one of his men got deathly sick. Local Native Americans told him about powerful waters, later to be known as Wilbur Hot Springs. Bidwell brought his man to the waters where he was miraculously cured. General John Bidwell went back to San Francisco and Chico (where he owned the best known farm in California) and spread the word of these healing waters.

Throughout America in the late 19th century, hot springs became very popular among those who could afford to stay at fashionable hot springs resorts – and to get there in the first place. Often the journeys were long and arduous – and getting to the Colusa County hot springs, soon to be as renowned as Germany's Baden-Baden spas, was no exception.

However, European settlers became attracted to the Wilbur Hot Springs area because of minerals – not in the water, but in the ground – first, copper and sulfur, then gold. In 1863, Ezekial Wilbur and Edwin Howell purchased a  ranch for $1,500. Formed to mine copper along Sulphur Creek, their partnership was soon disbanded when copper ore proved difficult to treat and decreased in value. Within eight months, Wilbur purchased Howell's share of the property for $200, built a wood-frame hotel and announced the opening of ‘Wilbur Hot Sulphur Springs’ in 1865.

Later that year, Wilbur Hot Sulphur Springs was sold to Marcus Marcuse of Marysville. Meanwhile, the reputation of the “miraculous cures” of Sulphur Creek continued to grow. To get there, guests would travel on the Southern Pacific Railroad to Williams, then travel  to the springs, a four-hour trip by stagecoach.

By 1891, however, Wilbur's fortunes were in decline due to an absentee owner and a better property at Sulphur Creek Village. A mile down the road, Sulphur Creek featured a resort and mining village – this time for gold. With its ramshackle bathhouses and neglected cabins, there was “no hotel worthy of the name” at Wilbur. In 1909, the place became a U.S. Post Office (in service until 1945) and was used as a way station for the local stagecoach. In 1915, the decrepit cabins were razed and Wilbur's then-owner, J. W. Cuthbert, built the existing concrete hotel, which was one of the first poured concrete buildings in California. Through the decades, the property continued to change hands, first to the Barker family (supposedly of Ma and Pa Barker fame) and then to the Sutcliff family.

Modern establishment
In the 1970s,  Richard Louis Miller became associated with Wilbur. Miller was a San Francisco psychologist who had left teaching at the University of Michigan in order to study in California with Virginia Satir, the founder of family therapy, and with Fritz Perls, the originator of Gestalt Therapy. Since the late 1960s, Miller had operated a clinic in San Francisco known as the Gestalt Institute for Multiple Psychotherapy. 

Miller opened the Hot Springs to the public in 1974. In 1981, he started Cokenders Alcohol and Drug program, closing the hotel for one week a month to hold this pioneering, non-institutional treatment program. There at Wilbur until 1990, Miller detoxified 1,500 addicted, chemically dependent patients using the hot springs’ waters and natural ambiance as healing detoxifying agents.

He placed a conservation easement on the property, thereby limiting development in perpetuity. As a result, Wilbur Hot Springs now has its own nature preserve.

In March 2014, the main hotel was severely damaged by fire.  The resort was temporarily closed for repairs.

Climate
The Köppen Climate Classification subtype for this climate is "Csa". (Mediterranean Climate).

See also
Richard Louis Miller

References

External links
Wilbur Hot Springs
Wilbur Hot Springs Institute for Ecological Health

Spa towns in California
Hot springs of California
Buildings and structures in Colusa County, California
Nature reserves in California
Protected areas of Colusa County, California
Tourist attractions in Colusa County, California
Bodies of water of Colusa County, California